The 1989 Singapore Open (known as Epson Singapore Super Tennis for sponsorship reasons) was a tennis tournament played on outdoor hard courts at the National Stadium in Singapore and was part of the 1989 Nabisco Grand Prix. The tournament took place from April 24 through April 30, 1989.

Finals

Singles

 Kelly Jones defeated  Amos Mansdorf 6–1, 7–5
 It was Jones' only title of the year and the 3rd of his career.

Doubles

 Rick Leach /  Jim Pugh defeated  Paul Chamberlin /  Paul Wekesa 6–3, 6–4
 It was Leach's 3rd title of the year and the 13th of his career. It was Pugh's 3rd title of the year and the 13th of his career.

Singapore Open
Singapore Open (men's tennis)
1989 in Singaporean sport